Events from the year 1740 in Wales.

Incumbents

Lord Lieutenant of North Wales (Lord Lieutenant of Anglesey, Caernarvonshire, Flintshire, Merionethshire, Montgomeryshire) – George Cholmondeley, 3rd Earl of Cholmondeley 
Lord Lieutenant of Glamorgan – Charles Powlett, 3rd Duke of Bolton
Lord Lieutenant of Brecknockshire and Lord Lieutenant of Monmouthshire – Thomas Morgan
Lord Lieutenant of Cardiganshire – John Vaughan, 2nd Viscount Lisburne
Lord Lieutenant of Carmarthenshire – vacant until 1755
Lord Lieutenant of Denbighshire – Sir Robert Salusbury Cotton, 3rd Baronet 
Lord Lieutenant of Pembrokeshire – Sir Arthur Owen, 3rd Baronet
Lord Lieutenant of Radnorshire – James Brydges, 1st Duke of Chandos

Bishop of Bangor – Thomas Herring 
Bishop of Llandaff – Matthias Mawson (until 21 October); John Gilbert (from 28 December)
Bishop of St Asaph – Isaac Maddox
Bishop of St Davids – Nicholas Clagett

Events
6 November - Charles Wesley records in his diary a visit to the Glascott family home at Cardiff.
date unknown - William Williams Pantycelyn becomes a deacon and is appointed curate to Theophilus Evans at Llanfaes.

Arts and literature

New books
John Dyer - The Ruins of Rome
Griffith Jones (Llanddowror) - Welsh Piety
Zachariah Williams - The Mariners Compass Completed

Music
Howell Harris - Llyfr o Hymneu o Waith Amryw Awdwyr (collection of hymns)

Births
23 February - Benjamin Evans, Congregational minister and author (died 1821)
26 December - John Williams (Ioan Rhagfyr), musician (died 1821)
date unknown - Sir Watkin Lewes, politician (died 1821)

Deaths
3 April - Thomas Dominic Williams, Roman Catholic bishop, 78/9
7 August - Jane Brereton, poet, 55
3 October - Price Devereux, 9th Viscount Hereford, politician, 76
20 October - Sir William Williams, 2nd Baronet, of Gray's Inn, politician, 75?
date unknown 
Enoch Francis, Baptist
John Morris, youngest of the Morris brothers of Anglesey, 34 (died at sea during an attack on Cartagena)

References

Wales
Wales